Humffrey Davies (Wmffre Dafydd ab Ifan) was a 17th-century Welsh poet. He is thought to have been from the Llanbrynmair area of Montgomeryshire.

His known work includes cywyddau, englynion, and Carols, etc. which are mostly of a religious and didactic nature. Some of these feature in the 'Llanstephan Manuscripts'.

References 

17th-century Welsh poets
People from Montgomeryshire